Gerónimo Ovelar (born 30 September 1951) is a Paraguayan former professional footballer who played for Paraguay, as a central defender.

Club career
Born in Lambaré, Paraguay, Ovelar began his career at Cerro Porteño, before joining Guaraní.

International career
Ovelar made three appearances for Paraguay in 1979, being part of the squad that lifted the 1979 Copa América.

Personal life
Ovelar's grandson is current Cerro Porteño forward Fernando Ovelar.

References

External links
 
 
 

1951 births
Living people
Paraguayan footballers
Paraguay international footballers
Association football defenders
Cerro Porteño players
Club Guaraní players
Copa América-winning players
1979 Copa América players